Mae Doelling Schmidt (née Mary Metzke; 22 May 1888 Chicago – 11 March 1965 Chicago) was an American virtuoso pianist, composer, clubwoman, and music educator from Chicago. She was on the faculty of the American Conservatory of Music.

Early life 
Mae Doelling Schmidt, born Mary Metzke, was the youngest of four girls born to Julius (aka August) Metzke (surname also spelled Mätzke; 1847–1907) and Marie J. Schwechert (maiden; 1854–1892), both German immigrants from Prussia who married in Chicago on August 28, 1878. Mae's mother died when she was  years old.

Adoptee parents 
Separated from her sisters when she was a toddler, Mae, when she was five, was adopted by German-born Chicagoans, Paul Wilhelm Doelling (1846-1909) and Ida B. Doelling (née Ida B. Wolff; 1852–1911) – who both immigrated to the United States in 1882. He was a cigar maker.  Paul and Ida Doelling also adopted Paula Hoffman in 1891.

Formal education 
At the age of 9 Doelling began studying in the Children's Department of the American Conservatory of Music, where at age 10 she earned a Silver Medal, and at age 12 a gold medal. At age 14, she entered the Royal Conservatory of Music at Dresden where she studied with Laura Rappoldi (née Laura Kahrer; 1853–1925), a former student of Liszt, Adolf von Henselt, and Hans von Bülow. Doelling earned a First Prize diploma there, at age 16. In the summer of 1918, Doelling participated in master classes held by Leopold Godowsky in Los Angeles.

In 1904, while studying in Berlin, Dölling competed and won a Mendelssohn Prize in piano (one of four winning pianists). The prize included a stipend of 200 Deutsche Marks (equivalent to about  euros in ).

Career 
Mae Doelling played piano in concerts and recitals, notably as a soloist with the Chicago Symphony Orchestra, the Women's Symphony Orchestra of Chicago, and the Milwaukee Symphony. She was a member of the Zukovsky Trio, with Alexander Zukovsky (1880–1942) (violin) and Theodore du Moulin (1888–1978) (cello). A 1922 report described Doelling as "forceful when necessary", but adding that "she relies on brains rather than physical strength to bring out the beauties of the music." She often included her own compositions in her programs. Her piano compositions included "Two Studies" (1922), "Venetienne" (1939), "Swiss Music Box" (1939), "Romance" (1939), "Tarantella for 2 solo pianos."

Mae Doelling Schmidt taught piano at the American Conservatory of Music. One of her piano students, Mae Willems (née Mary J. Willems; 1902–1967), who was blind, went on to become a celebrated pianist, singer, and music educator in Chicago. Doelling also gave presentations on the music of China and Latin America, to children and community groups. She was an officer in the Illinois Federation of Women's Clubs, and represented Chicago at a meeting of the National Federation of Music Clubs.

Selected performances 
At age 14 Doelling played before the last King of Saxony, Frederick Augustus III, at the Taschenbergpalais. She also performed for Princess Louise of Belgium and other royal audiences.

On November 29 1934 Doelling performed the American premier of Max Trapp's Concerto for Pianoforte in D Major, Op. 26, with the Chicago Symphony in the Auditorium Theatre, Frederick Stock conducting.

Schmidt actually performed the concerto earlier, on March 3 1934, for a private event hosted by plant pathologist Fred Reuel Jones, PhD (1884–1956), and wife, Edith Jones (née Edith Katharine Seymour; 1896–1984), at the College Club in Madison, Wisconsin, for 75 guests that included her sister, Mrs. Chester Barlow (née Louise Theadora Metzke; 1885–1976) – the second youngest of the four. The College Club at 12 East Gilman Street was the Madison branch of the American Association of University Women.

Personal life 
On July 4 1922 Mae Doelling married musician Richard Walter Schmidt (1888–1945) in Chicago at her residence at Pine Lodge, 3616 Pine Grove Avenue in the Norwood Park neighborhood. She died March 11, 1965 – age  – at the Illinois Masonic Hospital in Chicago.  She was buried four days later at Arcadia Park Cemetery, Near Norwood Park. She was a widow when she died.

Extant compositions

Music 

 "Romance"
 Mae Doelling Schmidt (composer)
 Clayton F. Summy Co. (publisher)
 © 8 December 1939; EP81427
 Renewed 10 August 1967; R415302
 Northern Trust Corporation (E)
 

 "Venetienne"
 Mae Doelling Schmidt (composer)
 Clayton F. Summy Co. (publisher)
 © 8 December 1939; EP81428
 Renewed 10 August 1967; R415301
 Northern Trust Corporation (E)
 

 "Swiss Music Box"
 Mae Doelling Schmidt (composer)
 Clayton F. Summy Co. (publisher)
 © 23 September 1940; EP87886
 Renewed 11 December 1967; R424412
 Northern Trust Corporation (E)

 "Native Hoosier"
 aka "Hoosier, Who's Your Father?, Who's Your Mother, Hoooo Hoosier?"
 Mae Doelling Schmidt (composer)
 Grace Patterson López-Díaz (words)
 Clayton F. Summy Co. (publisher)
 © 2 October 1940; EP88143
 

 "Tarantella," for 2 Solo pianos
 Mae Doelling Schmidt (music)
 

 "Exaltation"
 Mae Doelling Schmidt (composer)
 Josephine Hancock Logan (words)
 Carl Fischer, Inc. (publisher)
 © 23 June 1944; EP123745

 "Make Way, Here Comes the U.S.A." (song)
 Mae Doelling Schmidt (music)
 © 14 January 1943; EU320670

Dramatic works 

 George and Sally Applecore's Adventures in Latin America
 A dramatic composition with incidental music
 Mae Doelling Schmidt
 © 2 February 1948; DU12676

 Ye Olde Reliable, Tired and True, We Won't Do You, Booking Agency
 A skit with incidental music
 Mae Doelling Schmidt
 © 15 March 1948; DU13463

 The Enchanted Garden in Gnomerville
 A narrative: rhymed story and music
 Mae Doelling Schmidt
 © 6 November 1953; C7468

Copyright abbreviations:
 EP = Class E (musical compositions, published in the United States)
 EU = Class E (musical compositions, unpublished)
 DU = Class D (dramatic and dramatical-musical works, unpublished in the United States)
 C = Lectures and other works prepared for oral delivery
 R = Copyright renewal
 (E) = Executor of the author

Copyrights

Original copyrights (music) 
 Catalog of Copyright Entries, Part 3, Musical Compositions, New Series, Library of Congress, Copyright Office

Original copyrights (drama and theater) 
 Catalog of Copyright Entries, Parts 3 & 4, Dramas and Works Prepared for Oral Delivery, New Series, Library of Congress, Copyright Office

Copyright renewals 
 Catalog of Copyright Entries, Part 3, Musical Compositions, Third Series, Library of Congress, Copyright Office

Notes and references

Notes

References

External links 
 
 Photo: Exterior of Mr. and Mrs. Paul William Doelling's residence at 737 West Melrose Street, Chicago (Lake View, East neighborhood); Conrad Sulzer Regional Library: Ravenswood-Lake View Community Collection (re: Ravenswood, Lake View)Notes written on back: "Mr. and Mrs. Doelling, Mr. Utesch, Mr. and Mrs. Miller. Dogs – Nellie and Fanny"; 

1888 births
1965 deaths
20th-century American women pianists
20th-century American pianists
American composers
American Conservatory of Music alumni
Women in classical music
Classical accompanists
Classical musicians from Illinois
American adoptees